Qeshlaq-e Hajj Amir Forman (also Romanized as Qeshlāq-e Ḩājj Amīr Formān; also known as Qeshlāq-e Ḩājjī Farmān) is a village in Qeshlaq-e Shomali Rural District, in the Central District of Parsabad County, Ardabil Province, Iran. As of the 2006 census, its population was 45, in 11 families.

References 

Towns and villages in Parsabad County